Munson is an unincorporated community in Clearfield County, Pennsylvania, United States. Munson had a post office until September 28, 2002; it still has its own ZIP code, 16860.

References

Unincorporated communities in Clearfield County, Pennsylvania
Unincorporated communities in Pennsylvania